The 2007 FIBA Europe Under-18 Championship for Women Division C was the 6th edition of the Division C of the FIBA U18 Women's European Championship, the third tier of the European women's under-18 basketball championship. It was played in Malta from 28 August to 1 September 2007. The host team, Malta, won the tournament.

Participating teams

Final standings

References

2007
2007–08 in European women's basketball
FIBA U18
International basketball competitions hosted by Malta
FIBA